The Polish Episcopal Conference or Polish Bishops' Conference is the central organ of the Catholic Church in Poland. It is composed of 2 cardinals, 28 archbishops and 118 bishops.

Members
 President – abp Stanisław Gądecki (since 12 March 2014)
 Vicepresident – abp Marek Jędraszewski (since 13 March 2014)
 Secretary general – bp Artur Miziński  (since 10 June 2014)
 Presidium
 President – abp Stanisław Gądecki
 Vicepresident – abp Marek Jędraszewski
 Primate of Poland – abp Wojciech Polak
 Metropolitan Cardinals – card. Kazimierz Nycz
 Secretary general – bp Artur Miziński
 6 diocese bishops (chosen for 5 years) – abp Stanisław Budzik, abp Andrzej Dzięga, abp Grzegorz Ryś, abp Józef Kupny, abp Tadeusz Wojda, bp Andrzej Czaja
 2 auxiliary bishops (chosen for 5 years) – bp Damian Bryl, bp Piotr Turzyński
 Commissions (only bishops can be members)
 for the Doctrine of the Faith – head abp Stanisław Budzik
 for Catholic Education – head bp Wojciech Osial
 for Divine Worship and the Discipline of the Sacraments – head bp Piotr Greger
 for the Clergy – head abp Wojciech Polak
 for Christian ministry – head bp Andrzej Czaja
 for Missions – head bp Jerzy Mazur
 Charity – head bp Wiesław Szlachetka
 for Institutes of Consecrated Life and Societies of Apostolic Life – head bp Jacek Kiciński
 Marian – head abp Wacław Depo
 Bishops and religious superiors – head bp Artur Miziński
 for Polish diaspora – head bp Wiesław Lechowicz
 Revisions – head abp Stanisław Budzik
 Councils (priests, religious and lay members allowed)
 for Family – head bp Wiesław Śmigiel
 Science – head abp Marek Jędraszewski
 for Ecumenism – head bp Jacek Jezierski
 for Inter-Religious Dialogue – head bp Rafał Markowski
 for the Laity – head bp Adrian Galbas
 for Society problems – head bp Marian Florczyk
 for the Pastoral Care of Youth – head bp Marek Solarczyk
 for Culture and Cultural Heritage – head bp Michał Janocha
 for Social Communications – head abp Wacław Depo
 for the Pastoral Care of Migrants and Itinerants – head bp Krzysztof Zadarko
 Law – head bp Ryszard Kasyna
 Economical – head bp Jan Piotrowski
 Teams (priests, religious and lay members allowed)
 for contacts with French Episcopal Conference – head bp Jan Piotrowski
 for contacts with Lithuanian Episcopal Conference – head bp Romuald Kamiński
 for contacts with German Episcopal Conference – head bp Jan Kopiec
 for contacts with Ukrainian Greek Catholic Church – head bp Arkadiusz Trochanowski
 for contacts with Polish Ecumenical Council – head bp Jacek Jezierski
 for help Catholic Church in East – head bp Antoni Dydycz
 for contacts with Russian Orthodox Church – head abp Wojciech Polak
 for Scholarships – head bp Henryk Wejman
 for Dialogue – bp Adam Bab, bp Roman Pindel, bp Krzysztof Nitkiewicz, bp Jacek Jezierski, bp Henryk Wejman
 for Alcohol Abstinence – head bp Tadeusz Bronakowski
 for programmed television transmission of Masses – head abp Józef Górzyński
 for Enthronement of Christ movements – head bp Andrzej Czaja
 for the Pastoral Care of Health Care Workers – head bp Romuald Kamiński
 Bioethics – head bp Józef Wróbel
 for Sanctuary – head bp Henryk Ciereszko
 for the Pastoral Care of Radio Maryja – head bp Wiesław Śmigiel
 for Promoting the New Evangelization – head abp Grzegorz Ryś
 for novelization Polish Episcopal Conference regulations – head bp Krzysztof Wętkowski
 Press office
 Fr. Leszek Gęsiak SJ
 Concordat commission
 bp Artur Miziński

Presidents 
(Until 1994, position held ex officio by the Primate of Poland)
 1919–1926 – card. Edmund Dalbor
 1926–1948 – card. August Hlond
 1948–1981 – card. Stefan Wyszyński
 1981–2004 – card. Józef Glemp
 2004–2014 – abp Józef Michalik
 since 2014 – abp Stanisław Gądecki

Vicepresidents 
 1969–1978 – St. card. Karol Wojtyła
 1979–1994 – card. Franciszek Macharski
 1994–1999 – abp Henryk Muszyński
 1999–2004 – abp Józef Michalik
 2004–2014 – abp Stanisław Gądecki
 since 2014 – abp Marek Jędraszewski

Secretaries general 
 1918–1919 – bl. bp Antoni Julian Nowowiejski
 1919–1925 – bp Henryk Przeździecki
 1925–1926 – bp Romuald Jałbrzykowski
 1926–1946 – bp Stanisław Kostka Łukomski
 1946–1968 – bp Zygmunt Choromański
 1969–1993 – bp Bronisław Wacław Dąbrowski
 1993–1998 – bp Tadeusz Pieronek
 1998–2007 – bp Piotr Libera
 2007–2011 – bp Stanisław Budzik
 2011–2014 – bp Wojciech Polak
 since 2014 – bp Artur Miziński

See also
Episcopal Conference
Day of Prayers for Prisoners

References

Poland
Episcopal Conference